The Tipiṭakadhara Tipiṭakakovida Selection Examinations are the highest-level monastic examinations held annually in Burma since 1948, organized by the Ministry of Religious Affairs. It tests the candidates' memory of Tripiṭaka (or "Three Baskets") both in oral (five levels) and in written components (five levels). The examinations require candidates to display their mastery of "doctrinal understanding, textual discrimination, taxonomic grouping and comparative philosophy of Buddhist doctrine." A Sayadaw who has passed all levels of the examinations is often referred as the Sutabuddha.

History

In order to held Sixth Buddhist council at Burma in the Buddhist era 2500, the other Theravada five countries asked Burma whether there was the Tripiṭaka reciter in Burma. Therefore, the Burmese government held the Tipiṭakadhara Tipiṭakakovida Selection Examinations since 1948. The examinations are so difficult that no one could pass until 1953. Mingun Sayadaw became the first winner of the exam in 1953, and was appointed the position of Chaṭṭhasaṅgatisajaka (Chief Respondent) to answer the Dhamma questions asked by Mahasi Sayadaw.

Eligibility criteria
To take the examinations, the candidates must be only monks and novices who passed the examinations of Pathamagyi, Vinayavidu level, third level of Thamanaykyaw, or lecturer level of Cetiyangana and Sakyasiha.

Content

Recitation
The recitation content includes a cumulative 8026 pages of Tripiṭaka:
 851 pages from the first two texts of the Vinaya Piṭaka
 1409 pages from the second three texts of the Vinaya Piṭaka
 779 pages from the three Dīgha Nikāya texts of the Sutta Piṭaka
 1390 pages from the first five Abhidharma texts of the Abhidhamma Piṭaka
 3597 pages from the second two Abhidhammā texts of the Abhidhamma Piṭaka.

Ideology written answer
All texts are taken at the oral-based examination plus its relevant commentaries, sub-commentaries, and treatises.

Procedures

The whole examinations process takes 33 days in total – from last week of December to the third week of January – at the Kaba Aye Pagoda's Mahāpāsāṇa Cave in Yangon.

At the reciting part, candidates have to take a text for three days, and four times in the morning, and five times in the afternoon each day (25 minutes and 10-minute break per time). They will be prompted only five times in the whole day.

Those who passed the exam without being prompted are marked as "visiṭṭha" (distinguished).

Titles offered
Sayadaws who have passed five levels of ideology writing are awarded the degree of "Tipiṭakakovida", and the degree of "Tipiṭakadhara Tipiṭakakovida" is awarded to those who have passed all levels of the examination. Five years after receiving Tipiṭakadhara Tipiṭakakovida Degree, the Government of Myanmar offers him the title of Tipiṭakadhara Dhammabhanḍāgārika.

Reciting
 If one passes on one Piṭaka, a white Kanakkadan umbrella with red handle.
 If one passes on two Piṭakas, two white Kanakkadan umbrellas with red handles.
 If one passes on three Piṭakas, three white Kanakkadan umbrellas with red handles.
They are offered Sāsanā flags bearing the above emblems.

Ideology written answer
 If one passes one Piṭaka, a white Kanakkadan umbrella with a yellow handle.
 If one passes two Piṭaka, two white Kanakkadan umbrellas with a yellow handle, Sāsanā flag bearing above emblems, degree-certificate, water-land travel upper-class free ticket, rice for every month, and Navakamma-Vatthu money are offered monthly.
 If one passes three Tipiṭaka, three white Kanakkadan umbrellas with yellow handle. Sāsanā flag bearing above emblem, Tipiṭakadhara Tipiṭakakovidha pass-certificate, and water-land travel upper-class free ticket, monthly rice for alms-food and nāvakamma-vatthu are offered.

Recipients

The late Venerable Mingun Sayadaw is the first title-winner of the Tipiṭakadhara exam in Burma. As of 2020, only 15 monks have passed both the oral and written components, who are recognized by the Burmese government as "Sāsana Azani" (lit. "Noble Hero of the Buddhist doctrine").

The awarded 15 Tipiṭakadhara Tipiṭakakovida, Tipiṭakadhara Dhammabhanḍāgārika Sayadaws are as follows.

References

Examinations
Education in Myanmar
Buddhist monasticism